The Stowitts Museum & Library in Pacific Grove, California, United States, is dedicated to the work and legacy of the art of the American painter Hubert Julian Stowitts (1892–1953) and other 20th century overlooked and neglected fine arts painters.

References

External links
The Stowitts Museum & Library website

Biographical museums in California
Art museums and galleries in California
Museums in Monterey County, California
Pacific Grove, California